Money is a British television series based on the 1984 novel of the same name by British author Martin Amis. First aired in May 2010, the two-part series was produced for the BBC, starring Nick Frost in the lead role as John Self, with Tim Pigott-Smith, Hattie Morahan, Adrian Lukis, and Emma Pierson also featuring in the series.

External links

2010 British television series debuts
BBC television dramas
2010 British television series endings
2010s British drama television series